Oodgeroo Noonuccal (born Kathleen Jean Mary Ruska, later Kath Walker (3 November 192016 September 1993) was an Aboriginal Australian political activist, artist and educator, who campaigned for Aboriginal rights. Noonuccal was best known for her poetry, and was the first Aboriginal Australian to publish a book of verse.

Life as a poet, artist, writer and activist
Oodgeroo Noonuccal joined the Australian Women's Army Service in 1942, after her two brothers were captured by the Japanese at the fall of Singapore. Serving as a signaller in Brisbane she met many black American soldiers, as well as European Australians. These contacts helped to lay the foundations for her later advocacy of Aboriginal rights. During the 1940s, she joined the Communist Party of Australia because it was the only party which opposed the White Australia policy.

During the 1960s Walker emerged as a prominent political activist and writer. She was Queensland state secretary of the Federal Council for the Advancement of Aborigines and Torres Strait Islanders (FCAATSI), and was involved in a number of other political organisations. She was a key figure in the campaign for the reform of the Australian constitution to allow Aboriginal people full citizenship, lobbying Prime Minister Robert Menzies in 1965, and his successor Harold Holt in 1966. At one deputation in 1963, she taught Robert Menzies a lesson in the realities of Aboriginal life. After the Prime Minister offered the deputation an alcoholic drink, he was startled to learn from her that in Queensland he could be jailed for this.

She wrote many books, beginning with We Are Going (1964), the first book to be published by an Aboriginal woman. The title poem concludes:
The scrubs are gone, the hunting and the laughter.
The eagle is gone, the emu and the kangaroo are gone from this place.
The bora ring is gone.
The corroboree is gone.
And we are going.

This first book of poetry was extraordinarily successful, selling out in several editions, and setting Oodgeroo well on the way to be Australia's highest-selling poet alongside C. J. Dennis. Critics' responses were mixed, with some questioning whether Oodgeroo, as an Aboriginal person, could really have written it herself. Others were disturbed by the activism of the poems, and found that they were "propaganda" rather than what they considered to be real poetry. Oodgeroo embraced the idea of her poetry as propaganda, and described her own style as "sloganistic, civil-writerish, plain and simple." She wanted to convey pride in her Aboriginality to the broadest possible audience, and to popularise equality and Aboriginal rights through her writing.

Walker was inaugural president of the committee of the Aboriginal Publications Foundation, which published the magazine Identity in the 1970s.

In 1972 she bought a property on North Stradbroke Island (also known as Minjerribah) which she called Moongalba ("sitting-down place"), and established the Noonuccal-Nughie Education and Cultural Centre. And in 1977, a documentary about her, called Shadow Sister, was released. It was directed and produced by Frank Heimans and photographed by Geoff Burton. It describes her return to Moongalba and her life there. In a 1987 interview, she described her education program at Moongalba, saying that over "the last seventeen years I've had 26,500 children on the island. White kids as well as black. And if there were green ones, I'd like them too ... I'm colour blind, you see. I teach them about Aboriginal culture. I teach them about the balance of nature." Oodgeroo was committed to education at all levels, and collaborated with universities in creating programs for teacher education that would lead to better teaching in Australian schools.

On 13 June 1970, Noonuccal (as Kathleen Jean Mary Walker) received the award of Member of the Order of the British Empire (Civil) (MBE) for her services to the community.

In 1974 Noonuccal was aboard a British Airways flight that was hijacked by terrorists campaigning for Palestinian liberation. The hijackers shot a crew member and a passenger and forced the plane to fly to several different African destinations. During her three days in captivity, she used a blunt pencil and an airline sickbag from the seat pocket to write two poems, "Commonplace" and "Yusuf (Hijacker)".

In 1983 Noonuccal ran in the Queensland state election for the Australian Democrats political party in the Electoral district of Redlands. Her campaign focused around policies promoting the environment and Aboriginal rights. Receiving 6.4% of the primary vote, she was not elected.

In 1986 she played the part of Eva in Bruce Beresford's film, The Fringe Dwellers.

In December 1987, she announced she would return her MBE in protest over the Australian Government's intention to celebrate the Australian Bicentenary which she described as "200 years of sheer unadulterated humiliation" of Aboriginal people. She also announced she would change her name to Oodgeroo Noonuccal, with Oodgeroo meaning "paperbark tree" and Noonuccal (also spelt Nunukul) being her people's name.

Personal life and family
Noonuccal was born Kathleen Jean Mary Ruska on 3 November 1920 on North Stradbroke Island. She attended Dunwich State School and then became a domestic servant.

On 8 May 1943 she married childhood friend and Brisbane waterside worker Bruce Walker at the  Methodist Church, West End, Brisbane. The couple had one son Denis, but they later separated.

She worked for Raphael and Phyllis Cilento and had a second son, Vivian Charles Walker, with the Cilentos' son Raphael junior, born in Brisbane in 1953. In 1970 Vivian won the first Aboriginal scholarship to attend the National Institute of Dramatic Art, and worked in the performing and visual arts. He lived and worked abroad for many years before returning to Australia, where his talent was fostered by the Aboriginal National Theatre Trust, which was established in 1988. In 1988 he adopted the Indigenous name Kabul Oodgeroo Noonuccal, kabul meaning carpet snake, and in the same year co-authored The Rainbow Serpent with his mother, for Expo 88. In March 1990 he directed the world premiere of Munjong, by Richard Walley, at the Victorian Arts Centre. He died on 20 February 1991.

Oodgeroo Noonuccal died from cancer on 16 September 1993 at the Repatriation General Hospital at Greenslopes, Brisbane, aged 72 years and was buried at Moongalba on North Stradbroke Island.

In culture
A play has been written by Sam Watson entitled Oodgeroo: Bloodline to Country, based on Oodgeroo Noonuccal's real-life experience as an Aboriginal woman on board a flight hijacked by Palestinian terrorists on her way home from a committee meeting in Nigeria for the World Black and African Festival of Arts and Culture

Noonuccal's poetry has been set to music by numerous composers, including Christopher Gordon, Clare Maclean, Stephen Leek, Andrew Ford, Paul Stanhope, Mary Mageau, and Joseph Twist.

Recognition
Oodgeroo won several literary awards, including the Mary Gilmore Medal (1970), the Jessie Litchfield Award (1975), and the Fellowship of Australian Writers' Award.

She received an honorary Doctorate of Letters from Macquarie University for her contribution to Australian literature in 1988. She was also made an honorary Doctor of the University by Griffith University in 1989, and was awarded a further honorary Doctor of Letters degree in 1991 by Monash University. In 1992, Oodgeroo Noonuccal received an honorary Doctorate from the Faculty of Education Queensland University of Technology for both her contribution to literature and in recognition of her work in the field of education.

In 1979, she was awarded the Sixth Annual Oscar at the Micheaux Awards Ceremony, hosted by the US Black Filmmakers Hall of Fame and in the same year received the International Acting Award for the film Shadow Sisters.

She was appointed a Member of the Order of the British Empire in 1970, but returned the award in 1987 in protest at the Australian Bicentenary celebrations in order to make a political statement about the condition of her people.

In 1985, she was named Aboriginal of the Year, by the National Aborigines Day Observance Committee (NADOC, now NAIDOC), an honour bestowed by Indigenous people.

In 1991, the commemorative plaque with her name on it was one of the first installed on Sydney Writers Walk.

In 1992 Queensland University of Technology (QUT) awarded her an honorary doctorate from the Faculty of Education recognising her contributions to literature and education. In 2006 the university renamed their Aboriginal and Torres Strait Islander Support Unit as the Oodgeroo Unit in her honour. The university also has the Oodgeroo Scholarship Program which provides undergraduate and postgraduate scholarships for Aboriginal and Torres Strait Islander students.

In 2009 as part of the Q150 celebrations, she was announced as one of the Q150 Icons of Queensland for her role as an "Influential Artist".

In 2016 the Queensland Poetry Festival introduced an Indigenous program which included the inaugural Oodgeroo Noonuccal Indigenous Poetry Prize.

The electoral district of Oodgeroo created in the 2017 Queensland state electoral redistribution was named after her.

Her work 

Poetry

 Municipal Gum (1960)
 "A Song of Hope" (1960)
 We are Going: Poems (1964)
 The Dawn is at Hand: Poems (1966)
Ballad of the Totebrush (1966)
The Past (1970)
White Australia (1970)
All One Race (1970)
Freedom (1970)
Then and Now (1970)
Last of His Tribe (1970)
 My People: A Kath Walker collection (1970)
 No More Boomerang (1985)
 Then and now (1985)
 Kath Walker in China (1988)
The Unhappy Race (1992
 The Colour Bar (1990)
Let Us Not Be Bitter (1990)
 Oodgeroo (1994)

For children
 Stradbroke Dreamtime (1972)
 Father Sky and Mother Earth (1981)
 Little Fella (1986) 
 The Rainbow Serpent (1988)

Non fiction
 Towards a Global Village in the Southern Hemisphere (1989)
 The Spirit of Australia (1989)
 Australian Legends And Landscapes (1990)
 Australia's Unwritten History: More legends of our land (1992)
 Oodgeroo of the tribe Nunukul in The Republicanism Debate (1993)

Notes

References 

 
 
 

Secondary sources
 Beier, Ulli. Quandamooka, the art of Kath Walker (1985) 
 Shoemaker, Adam (Ed.) Oodgeroo: A tribute (1994)

External links 

  at Oodgeroo Noonuccal - Australian Poetry Library
 
 University of Queensland's Fryer Library Online Exhibition "Oodgeroo Noonuccal Kath Walker 1920–1993"
University of Queensland Fryer Library Online Exhibition "1967 Referendum: Queensland organisations and activists"
 Interview from 1981. "Oodgeroo Noonuccal: Legacy of a True National Treasure of Australia." With profile.
 Oodgeroo Noonuccal Papers Catalogue of manuscripts at Fryer Library (University of Queensland)
Videoclip from 'This is your life'
 Article discussing Sam Watson's play about OodOodgeroo Noonuccal
 
 Listen to a recording of Oodgeroo Noonuccal reading her poem 'We Are Going' on australianscreen online
 'We Are Going' was added to the National Film and Sound Archive's Sounds of Australia registry in 2010

1920 births
1993 deaths
Australian human rights activists
Women human rights activists
20th-century Australian non-fiction writers
Indigenous Australian writers
Australian Members of the Order of the British Empire
People from South East Queensland
Australian indigenous rights activists
Communist Party of Australia members
Australian women poets
20th-century Australian women writers
20th-century Australian poets
Communist women writers
Writers from Queensland
People from Redland City